The 1994 NHL Entry Draft was the 32nd NHL Entry Draft. It was held at the Hartford Civic Center on June 28–29, 1994.

The last active players in the NHL from this draft class were Patrik Elias and Eric Boulton, who both played their last NHL games in the 2015–16 season.

Selections by round
Club teams are located in North America unless otherwise noted.

Round one

Notes
 The Winnipeg Jets' first-round pick went to the Edmonton Oilers as the result of a trade on March 15, 1994 that sent Dave Manson and St. Louis' sixth-round pick in 1994 (146th overall) to Winnipeg in exchange for Boris Mironov, Mats Lindgren, Florida's fourth-round pick in 1994 (79th overall) and this pick.
 The Quebec Nordiques' first-round pick went to the New York Islanders as the result of a trade on June 28, 1994 that sent Uwe Krupp and a first-round pick in 1994 (12th overall) to Quebec in exchange for Ron Sutter and this pick.
 The Philadelphia Flyers' first-round pick went to the Washington Capitals as the result of a trade on June 28, 1994 that sent Mike Ridley and St. Louis' first-round pick in 1994 (16th overall) to Toronto in exchange for Rob Pearson and this pick.
Toronto previously acquired this pick as the result of a trade on June 28, 1994 that sent Wendel Clark, Sylvain Lefebvre, Landon Wilson and a first-round pick in 1994 (22th overall) to Quebec in exchange for Mats Sundin, Garth Butcher, Todd Warriner and this pick.
Quebec previously acquired this pick as the result of a trade on June 30, 1992 that sent the Eric Lindros to Philadelphia in exchange for Ron Hextall, Peter Forsberg, Steve Duchesne, Kerry Huffman, Mike Ricci, a first-round pick in 1993, future considerations (Chris Simon on July 21, 1992), $15 million in cash and this pick.
 The New York Islanders' first-round pick went to the Quebec Nordiques as the result of a trade on June 28, 1994 that sent Ron Sutter and a first-round pick in 1994 (9th overall) to New York in exchange for Uwe Krupp and this pick.
 The St. Louis Blues' first-round pick went to the Toronto Maple Leafs as the result of a trade on June 28, 1994 that sent Rob Pearson and a first-round pick in 1994 (10th overall) to Washington in exchange for Mike Ridley and this pick.
Washington previously acquired this pick as compensation for not matching an offer sheet from St. Louis to restricted free agent Scott Stevens on July 16, 1990.
 The Toronto Maple Leafs' first-round pick went to the Quebec Nordiques as the result of a trade on June 28, 1994 that sent Mats Sundin, Garth Butcher, Todd Warriner and a first-round pick in 1994 (10th overall) to Toronto in exchange for Wendel Clark, Sylvain Lefebvre, Landon Wilson and this pick.

Round two

Notes
 The Hartford Whalers' second-round pick went to the Florida Panthers as compensation for allowing Hartford to select Chris Pronger in draft on June 26, 1994.
 The Philadelphia Flyers' second-round pick went to the Florida Panthers as compensation for General Manager Bobby Clarke on June 15, 1994.
 The St. Louis Blues' second-round pick went to the Vancouver Canucks as compensation for not matching an offer sheet from St. Louis to restricted free agent Petr Nedved on March 4, 1994.

Round three

Notes
 The Florida Panthers' third-round pick went to the Edmonton Oilers as the result of a trade on December 6, 1993 that sent Geoff Smith and a fourth-round pick in 1994 (84th overall) to Florida in exchange for St. Louis' sixth-round pick in 1994 (146th overall) and this pick.
 The Mighty Ducks of Anaheim's third-round pick went to the Montreal Canadiens as the result of a trade on August 10, 1993 that sent Todd Ewen and Patrik Carnback to Anaheim in exchange for this pick.
 The Ottawa Senators' third-round pick went to the Tampa Bay Lightning as the result of a trade on June 29, 1994 that sent Washington's third-round pick in 1994 (67th overall) and a 1995 (82nd overall) to Anaheim in exchange for this pick.
Anaheim previously acquired this pick as the result of a trade on June 28, 1994 that sent the Sean Hill and a ninth-round pick in 1994 (210th overall) to Ottawa in exchange for this pick.
 The Hartford Whalers' third-round pick went to the Pittsburgh Penguins as the result of a trade on March 10, 1992 that sent Frank Pietrangelo to Hartford in exchange for a seventh-round pick in 1994 (161st overall) and this pick.
 The Edmonton Oilers' third-round pick went to the Winnipeg Jets as the result of a trade on December 6, 1993 that sent Fredrik Olausson and a seventh-round pick in 1994 (160th overall) to Edmonton in exchange for this pick.
 The Tampa Bay Lightning's third-round pick went to the Edmonton Oilers as the result of a trade on June 16, 1993 that sent Petr Klima to Tampa Bay in exchange for this pick.
 The San Jose Sharks' third-round pick went to the New York Islanders as the result of a trade on June 20, 1993 that sent Jeff Norton to San Jose in exchange for future considerations and this pick.
 The New York Islanders' third-round pick went to the Toronto Maple Leafs as the result of a trade on June 28, 1994 that sent a second-round pick in 1995 to New York in exchange for this pick.
 The Chicago Blackhawks' third-round pick went to the San Jose Sharks as the result of a trade on July 13, 1993 that sent Jeff Hackett to Chicago in exchange for this pick.
 The Washington Capitals' third-round pick went to the Mighty Ducks of Anaheim as the result of a trade on June 29, 1994 that sent Ottawa's third-round pick in 1994 (55th overall) to Tampa Bay in exchange for a fourth-round pick in 1995 and this pick.
Tampa Bay previously acquired this pick as the result of a trade on March 21, 1994 that sent Joe Reekie to Washington in exchange for Enrico Ciccone, Tampa Bay's conditional fifth-round pick in 1995 and this pick.
 The Calgary Flames' third-round pick went to the New Jersey Devils as the result of a trade on June 29, 1994 that sent a third-round pick, Vancouver's fourth-round pick and Ottawa's fifth-round pick all in 1994 (77th, 91st and 107th overall) to Calgary in exchange for this pick.
 The Dallas Stars' third-round pick went to the Quebec Nordiques as the result of a trade on February 13, 1994 that sent the rights to Manny Fernandez to Dallas in exchange for Tommy Sjodin and this pick.
 The Boston Bruins' third-round pick went to the Pittsburgh Penguins as the result of a trade on October 8, 1993 that sent Paul Stanton to Boston in exchange for this pick.
 The Toronto Maple Leafs' third-round pick went to the Montreal Canadiens as the result of a trade on August 20, 1992 that sent Sylvain Lefebvre and future considerations to Toronto in exchange for this pick.
 The New Jersey Devils' third-round pick went to the Calgary Flames as the result of a trade on June 29, 1994 that sent a third-round pick (71st overall) to New Jersey in exchange for Vancouver's fourth-round pick and Ottawa's fifth-round pick both in 1994 (91st and 107th overall) and this pick.

Round four

Notes
 The Florida Panthers' fourth-round pick went to the Edmonton Oilers as the result of a trade on March 15, 1994 that sent Dave Manson and St. Louis' sixth-round pick in 1994 (146th overall) to Winnipeg in exchange for Boris Mironov, Mats Lindgren, a first-round pick in 1994 (4th overall) and this pick.
Winnipeg previously acquired this pick as the result of a trade on September 30, 1993 that sent Evgeny Davydov and a conditional fourth-round pick in 1994 to Florida in exchange for this pick.
 The Edmonton Oilers' fourth-round pick went to the Florida Panthers as the result of a trade on December 6, 1993 that sent a third-round pick and St. Louis' sixth-round pick (53rd and 146th overall) both in 1994 to Edmonton in exchange for Geoff Smith and this pick.
 The Los Angeles Kings' fourth-round pick went to the Chicago Blackhawks as the result of a trade on March 21, 1994 that sent Kevin Todd to Los Angeles in exchange for this pick.
 The Tampa Bay Lightning's fourth-round pick was re-acquired as the result of a trade on January 28, 1993 that sent Basil McRae, Doug Crossman and a fourth-round pick in 1996 to St. Louis in exchange for Jason Ruff, Tampa Bay's fifth-round pick in 1995, Tampa Bay's sixth-round pick in 1996 and this pick.
St. Louis previously acquired this pick as the result of a trade on June 19, 1992 that sent Pat Jablonski, Darin Kimble, Rob Robinson and Steve Tuttle to Tampa Bay in exchange for a fifth-round pick in 1995, a sixth-round pick in 1996 and this pick.
 The Vancouver Canucks' fourth-round pick went to the Calgary Flames as the result of a trade on June 29, 1994 that sent a third-round pick (71st overall) to New Jersey in exchange for a third-round pick and Ottawa's fifth-round pick both in 1994 (77th and 107th overall) and this pick.
New Jersey previously acquired this pick as the result of a trade on May 31, 1994 that sent Jeff Toms to Tampa Bay in exchange for this pick.
Tampa Bay previously acquired this pick as the result of a trade on November 3, 1992 that sent Anatoli Semenov to Vancouver in exchange for Dave Capuano and this pick.
 The Chicago Blackhawks' fourth-round pick went to the Vancouver Canucks as the result of a trade on March 21, 1994 that sent Robert Dirk to Chicago in exchange for this pick.
 The Buffalo Sabres' fourth-round pick went to the Edmonton Oilers as the result of a trade on September 1, 1993 that sent Craig Simpson to Buffalo in exchange for Jozef Cierny and this pick.
 The Toronto Maple Leafs' fourth-round pick went to the New York Rangers as the result of a trade on March 21, 1994 that sent Mike Gartner to Toronto in exchange for Glenn Anderson, rights to Scott Malone and this pick.
 The Detroit Red Wings' fourth-round pick went to the Philadelphia Flyers as the result of a trade on November 5, 1993 that sent Terry Carkner to Detroit in exchange for Yves Racine and this pick.

Round five

Round six

Round seven

Round eight

Round nine

Round ten

Round eleven

Draftees based on nationality

See also
 1994 NHL Supplemental Draft
 1994–95 NHL season
 List of NHL players

References

External links
1994 NHL Entry Draft at Hockey Reference
1994 NHL Entry Draft player stats at The Internet Hockey Database

National Hockey League Entry Draft
Draft
Hockey
National Hockey League in New England
Hockey